Ramiro Macagno (born 18 March 1997) is an Argentine footballer who plays for Newell's Old Boys as a goalkeeper.

References

External links

1997 births
Living people
Argentine people of Italian descent
Association football goalkeepers
Argentine footballers
Atlético de Rafaela footballers
Newell's Old Boys footballers
Argentine Primera División players
Primera Nacional players